Hisako is a Japanese name for females. Although written romanized the same way, the kanji can be different.

Hisako may refer to:
Hisako Arakaki (born 1977), J-pop singer
Hisako Hibi (born 1907), Japanese painter
Hisako Higuchi (born 1945), Japanese professional golfer
Hisako Kanemoto (born 1987), Japanese voice actress
Hisako Koyama (born 1916), Japanese solar observer
Hisako Kyōda (born 1935), Japanese voice actress
Hisako Manda (born 1958), Japanese actress
Hisako Matsubara (born 1935), Japanese novelist
Hisako Ōishi (born 1936), Japanese politician
Hisako Sasaki (born 1967), Japanese professional wrestler
Hisako Shirata (born 1982),  Japanese actress
, Japanese judge
Hisako Terasaki (born 1928), Japanese-American etcher
Hisako Tōjō (born 1990), Japanese voice actress
Hisako Tottori, (born 1953), later the Princess Takamado of Japan

Characters 
Hisako, guitarist of Girls Dead Monster in the anime Angel Beats!
Hisako, an undead spirit in the video game Killer Instinct
Hisako Ichiki, a student in the X-Men comics

Japanese feminine given names